Edgewood is a census-designated place (CDP) in Siskiyou County, California, United States. Its population is 72 as of the 2020 census, up from 43 from the 2010 census. Edgewood is located three miles north of the town of Weed.

Geography
Edgewood is located at  (41.461691, -122.427091).

Demographics

2010
The 2010 United States Census reported that Edgewood had a population of 43. The racial makeup was 41 (95.3%) White, 0 (0.0%) African American, 0 (0.0%) Native American, 0 (0.0%) Asian, 0 (0.0%) Pacific Islander, 1 (2.3%) from other races, and 1 (2.3%) from two or more races. Hispanic or Latino of any race were 2 persons (4.7%).

The census reported that 43 people (100% of the population) lived in households, 0 (0%) lived in non-institutionalized group quarters and 0 (0%) were institutionalized.

There were 18 households, of which 5 (27.8%) had children under the age of 18 living in them, 15 (83.3%) were opposite-sex married couples living together, 0 (0%) had a female householder with no husband present, 0 (0%) had a male householder with no wife present. There were 0 (0%) unmarried opposite-sex partnerships, and 0 (0%) same-sex married couples or partnerships. 3 households (16.7%) were made up of individuals, and 2 (11.1%) had someone living alone who was 65 years of age or older. The average household size was 2.39. There were 15 families (83.3% of all households); the average family size was 2.67.

9 people (20.9%) were under the age of 18, 1 people (2.3%) aged 18 to 24, 5 people (11.6%) aged 25 to 44, 22 people (51.2%) aged 45 to 64, and 6 people (14.0%) who were 65 years of age or older.  The median age was 54.8 years. For every 100 females, there were 79.2 males. For every 100 females age 18 and over, there were 78.9 males.

There were 19 housing units at an average density of 18.6 per square mile (7.2/km), of which 16 (88.9%) were owner-occupied, and 2 (11.1%) were occupied by renters. The homeowner vacancy rate was 0%; the rental vacancy rate was 0%. 37 people (86.0% of the population) lived in owner-occupied housing units and 6 people (14.0%) lived in rental housing units.

2000
At the 2000 census. of 2000, there were 67 people, 25 households and 19 families residing in the CDP. The racial makeup was 88.06% White, 4.48% African American, 1.49% Native American, 1.49% Asian, and 4.48% from two or more races. Hispanic or Latino of any race were 7.46% of the population.

There were 25 households, of which 24.0% had children under the age of 18 living with them, 64.0% were married couples living together, 4.0% had a female householder with no husband present, and 24.0% were non-families. 16.0% of all households were made up of individuals, and 8.0% had someone living alone who was 65 years of age or older. The average household size was 2.68 and the average family size was 3.05.

28.4% of the population were under the age of 18, 3.0% from 18 to 24, 19.4% from 25 to 44, 28.4% from 45 to 64, and 20.9% who were 65 years of age or older. The median age was 45 years. For every 100 females, there were 97.1 males. For every 100 females age 18 and over, there were 108.7 males.

The median household income was $50,750 and the median family income was $50,500. Males had a median income of $38,750 and females $35,000. The per capita income was $32,172. There were 11.1% of families and 10.9% of the population living below the poverty line, including 6.3% of under eighteens and none of those over 64.

Education
Butteville Elementary School is located within Edgewood. The school provides education for pre-K to the 8th grade. Enrollment includes children from Lake Shastina and Weed, and totaled 210 students in fall 2012. Weed High School and College of the Siskiyous are a short distance away.

Transportation
Weed Airport, at exit 753 just off Interstate 5, is located on the northern end of the Edgewood area.

Politics

References

Mount Shasta
Census-designated places in Siskiyou County, California
Census-designated places in California